Live! (More or Less) is an album released in 1976 under Richard Thompson's name, but mostly consisting of work actually recorded with his then wife as Richard and Linda Thompson.

This was a U.S. only release. The first disc of the two-disc set is, in fact, the 1974 release I Want to See the Bright Lights Tonight by Richard and Linda Thompson. The second disc consists of eight tracks from the (guitar, vocal) compilation issued only in the UK, two of which were recorded live.

The album was critically well-received on its release, but only because it included I Want to See the Bright Lights Tonight, which had come to be very well regarded. Its ratings either reflect that fact or that it is redundant and only significant to completists.

Track listing
All songs written by Richard Thompson except where indicated otherwise.

Disc one

Disc two

References 

1976 albums
Richard Thompson (musician) albums
Richard and Linda Thompson albums
Albums produced by John Wood (record producer)
Island Records albums